Yelta was a small railway station located on the Yelta railway line, in the small township of Yelta, Victoria.
It once had a medium-sized platform, which was demolished around 2004.
The passenger service ceased in 1937, due to light patronage and high expenses.
The station has a few grain silos, as the only trains the station regularly sees are grain trains.
The future of the station is uncertain.

References

External links
 Pictures of Yelta, vicrailstations

Disused railway stations in Victoria (Australia)